Swan J. Turnblad  (October 7, 1860 – May 17, 1933) was an American newspaper publisher. Turnblad was the manager of the Svenska Amerikanska Posten, a Swedish language newspaper in Minneapolis, Minnesota. Later in his life he donated property and money to help create the American Swedish Institute.

Early life
Turnblad was born Sven Johan Olofsson in Tubbemåla, Vislanda, Kronoberg County, Småland, Sweden in 1860. His family were farmers but, following a series of bad harvests, they decided to immigrate to the United States in 1868. The family settled in Vasa Township, Goodhue County, Minnesota, where there was already a sizable community of Swedish immigrants. He attended local schools and after graduating high school he worked as a teacher and helped with the family's farm for several years. In 1878 he moved to Minneapolis, where he worked as a typesetter at several Swedish-language newspapers. Soon after arriving in the city he met another Swedish immigrant, Christina Nilsson (1861-1929). The couple married in 1883 and the following year Christina gave birth to her only child, Lillian Zenobia Turnblad (1884-1943).

Svenska Amerikanska Posten
In 1887, Turnblad became the manager of the Swedish-language newspaper Svenska Amerikanska Posten. His brother, Magnus Turnblad, joined him as the editor in 1890. Turnblad was very interested in new technology and was the first publisher of a Swedish language newspaper to use a Linotype machine. After acquiring a duplex rotary color printing press in 1903, Turnblad also included color illustrations. Under Turnblad's management circulation increased steadily, growing from just 1,400 in 1887 to 40,000 by 1900. In The success of Svenska Amerikanska Posten together with his other investments made Turnblad very wealthy.

American Swedish Institute
In 1903, Turnblad commissioned the building of a mansion on Park Avenue in Minneapolis. Turnblad had the Minneapolis firm of Boehme and Cordella design a Châteauesque-style 33-room mansion for him, his wife, and their daughter. Built on a combination of six city lots, the home cost $1.5 million ($ million in ) and took four years to complete. The family moved into their new home in 1908. While it was their official residence, they spent most of their time living in an apartment across the street after 1915. After Turnblad's wife died in 1929, he and his daughter moved into the apartment full-time and turned their former home into a museum. Turnblad created the American Institute for Swedish Art, Literature and Science (later renamed to the American Swedish Institute), which was housed in his former residence, as a place to preserve Swedish customs and culture.

Later life and death
Turnblad died in 1933. He was buried in Lakewood Cemetery in Minneapolis.

References

Other sources
Anderson, Philip J.; Dag Blanck (2001)  Swedes in the Twin Cities: Immigrant Life and Minnesota's Urban Frontier (Minneapolis, MN: Minnesota Historical Society Press) 
Gump, Gertrude   (1976) The Story of Swan Johan Turnblad (Minneapolis, MN: American Swedish Institute)
Lewis, Anne Gillespie  (1999) Turnblad's Castle (Minneapolis, MN: American Swedish Institute)

External links
 
American Swedish Institute website
Swan Turnblad house at the City of Minneapolis website.

1860 births
1933 deaths
American newspaper publishers (people)
Businesspeople from Minneapolis
Swedish emigrants to the United States
Burials at Lakewood Cemetery